Small Vraca (Mala Vraca) is a peak of the Šar Mountains located in Kosovo and North Macedonia. Small Vraca is one of the most southern peaks of the Šar Mountains.

See also 
Big Vraca

Notes

References 

Šar Mountains
Two-thousanders of Kosovo
Two-thousanders of North Macedonia